"Contagious Love" is a song by American singers Bella Thorne and Zendaya, and from soundtrack album Shake It Up: I Love Dance. It was released as a single on February 14, 2013 in United States and February 19, worldwide.

Critical reception
Victoria V. of Verily Victoria Vocalises said the song was "catchy and dancy without being patronising" and that people would be hooked by the melody. She also commented that "Its sweet harmonies and catch chorus echo the song’s universal message about living life to the fullest". The Trips from the Disney said the song was "upbeat & fun", a "jam packed full of energy and zest for life and is sure to get your kids up & busting their moves" and "catchy hooks and rap sections with synths used to great effect".

Commercial reception
"Contagious Love" peaked at number one on Billboard Kid Digital Songs on April 13, 2013.

Live performances
The song was performed on April 28, 2013 during the episode of Shake It Up, "Love and War It Up". On February 14, Thorne and Zendaya released and performed the song on Radio Disney.

Music video
The video was directed by Marc Klasfeld. The music video for this song was released on March 1, 2013 on Disney Channel and hours later on the official Disney Music Vevo account on YouTube.

Chart performance

Release history

References

2013 singles
2013 songs
Bella Thorne songs
Zendaya songs
Walt Disney Records singles